is a railway station in the city of Ōgaki, Gifu Prefecture Japan, operated by the private railway operator Yōrō Railway.

Lines

Station layout
Nishi-Ōgaki Station has two ground-level side platforms connected by a level crossing. The station is staffed.

Platforms

Adjacent stations

|-
!colspan=5|Yōrō Railway

History
Nishi-Ōgaki Station opened on July 31, 1913.

Passenger statistics
In fiscal 2015, the station was used by an average of 334 passengers daily (boarding passengers only).

Surrounding area
  Nippon Synthetic Chemical Industry Co.,Ltd. Ogaki plant

See also
 List of Railway Stations in Japan

References

External links

 

Railway stations in Gifu Prefecture
Railway stations in Japan opened in 1913
Stations of Yōrō Railway
Ōgaki